Bersone (Barsùn in local dialect) was a comune (municipality) in Trentino in the northern Italian region Trentino-Alto Adige/Südtirol, located about  southwest of Trento. It was merged with Daone and Praso on January 1, 2015, to form a new municipality, Valdaone.

Bersone borders the following municipalities: Daone, Praso, Pieve di Bono, Prezzo, and Castel Condino.

Demographic evolution

References

External links
 www.comune.bersone.tn.it

Cities and towns in Trentino-Alto Adige/Südtirol
Valdaone